Syncopacma polychromella is a moth of the family Gelechiidae, it was described by Hans Rebel in 1902.

Description
The wingspan is 7–10 mm. The head is white. The thorax brown mixed with white. The forewings are pale brown with a post median jagged white band and a dark apical 1/3.

Range
It is found on the Iberian Peninsula and in the Czech Republic, Austria, Italy, Croatia, North Macedonia, Greece and Russia, as well as on the Canary Islands, Sicily, Malta and Crete. It is also present in Algeria, Egypt, Palestine, Jordan, Syria, Kuwait, Yemen, Central Asia (including Uzbekistan), Sudan, Namibia and South Africa. It has been recorded in Denmark, France, Great Britain and Ireland. In Britain the moth was  first recorded, in February 1952, at Bexley, Kent and the second at Hook, Surrey in February 1992; most likely as accidental introductions. It  has since been recorded as a migrant to England.

Immigration
In December 2015, during an extended period of airflow from as far south as the Azores, at least seventeen have been reported in southern England over three days (16 – 19 December).

Host plant
The larvae feed on Astragalus unifoliolatus.

References

External links

images representing  Aproaerema polychromella at Consortium for the Barcode of Life
Lepiforum
UK Moths

Syncopacma
Moths described in 1902
Moths of Africa
Moths of Asia
Moths of Europe
Taxa named by Hans Rebel